Jaswinder Brar is an Indian folk singer who sings in Punjabi language. She sings Punjabi folk and Bhangra and known as the Folk Queen. She is known for her stage shows and is called Akharheya Di Rani. She is specially known for her Lok Tatths. She started her career with the album named "Keemti Cheez" in 1990.

Life 
She got married on 2000 to Ranjit Singh Sidhu  and took a break for about two years from singing while she had given birth to a daughter named Jashanpreet Kaur

Awards and honors 

Among her awards, she is honoured with the "Shromani Punjabi Lok Gaaiki Award 2010" in November; she is the 12th to receive that award. She received others including Sangeet Samrat award on Prof. Mohan Singh Mela. She was nominated for the PTC Channel Punjabi's music awards 2006, for "Best Folk Oriented Vocalist (Female)" (for her song "Mirza") and "Best Oriented Folk Album (Female)" (for her album Gallan Pyar Dian) and awarded as best folk vocalist female 2006.

Discography 

She started her career with the album named Keemti Cheez in 1990 and released several albums since then.
 Keemti Cheez
 Khulla Akharha
 Ranjha Jogi Ho Gia
 Akhara
 Ishq Mohabbat Yaari
 Dooja Akhara
 Itt Khrakka
 Goonjda Akhara
 Bol Kalaihria Mora
 Jhalla Dil Waajan Maarda
 Rondi Nu Hor Rava Ke
 Teri Yaad Sataave
 Main Teri Jann Gherungi
 Main Tan Tainu Yaad Kardi
 Gallaan Pyar Dian
 Pyar – The Colors of Love (02 Nov. 2010)
 Jeonde Rehn (2014)
 Tin Gallan  (2018)

See also 
 Narinder Biba
 Gurmeet Bawa
 Shazia Manzoor
 Surinder Kaur
 Anita Lerche
 List of Punjabi singers

References 

1973 births
Bhangra (music) musicians
Indian women folk singers
Living people
Punjabi-language singers
Singers from Punjab, India
People from Bathinda
20th-century Indian singers
20th-century Indian women singers
21st-century Indian singers
21st-century Indian women singers
Women musicians from Punjab, India